Quarantine is a Russian-Finnish dystopian drama film written and directed by Diana Ringo. The film premiered on 14 September 2021 in Blagoveschensk, Russia. Moscow premiere was held on 4th of October at KARO Oktyabr. The film is an official non-English language Golden Globes 2022 entry (Russia, Finland).

Plot
In the near-future, the protagonist of the film, Felix, has not left his house for more than 20 years, since the whole world was placed under quarantine. After the quarantine was announced, a global catastrophe happened. Felix was one of the few who managed to hide underground, in a bunker, and survive. He is completely alone, without any means of communication. His only companions are the ghosts of the people he once knew. Felix is haunted by the idea that he could have stopped the disaster, since he had the opportunity to tell the truth to the world.

Felix recalls conversations with Kirill, his former friend, who said that during a crisis it is only possible to survive if one remains silent and does not interfere with the ongoing events. Felix's female friend on the other hand was convinced that it is possible to save the world and that Felix must disclose the secret information that he is in possession of.

Cast 
 Anatoliy Beliy as Felix
 Aleksandr Obmanov as Kirill
 Diana Ringo as Her
 Aleksey Sharanin as radio announcer (voice)

Production
The film was shot in Russia, Ukraine, Finland and Austria. Quarantine is an independent film made without government support. The film is the directorial debut of composer Diana Ringo, who wrote the soundtrack and script for the film. She wrote the screenplay during the Covid-19 lockdown in Vienna, Austria. Merited Artist of the Russian Federation Anatoly Bely starred in the main role of the protagonist Felix in the film. For actor Aleksandr Obmanov, it was his first starring role in a feature film.

Music
Besides directing, Diana Ringo has an extensive background as a pianist and composer. Quarantine soundtrack consists of classical style compositions combined with modern sounds of synthesizers which mirror the bleak and tormented inner world of the protagonist as envisioned by Diana Ringo. The original motion picture soundtrack was written by Diana Ringo using her keyboard and Logic Pro X with various VST plugins by Native Instruments.

The film's soundtrack consisting of 26 tracks covering a duration of 1:02:58 was made available on YouTube on 22 February 2021. In 2022 the soundtrack has been released on Bandcamp. In the film some of the music is shortened, while the released soundtrack album contains music in full-length, as originally recorded.

Release
World premiere of the film was held on 14 September 2021 at the Amur Autumn Film and Theater Festival in Blagoveschensk, Russia. Moscow premiere was held on 4th of October at the KARO Oktyabr cinema center.

The film was also screened in 2021 in Vienna, Austria, and Prague, Czechia.

In 2022 the film was selected for the main program of the 5th Ravno Selo Film Festival in Serbia. Founder of the festival is Lazar Ristovski.

Quarantine was released on digital streaming by Prime Video on November 2 2021. In 2022 the film has also been released on the FilmDoo platform.

Awards
Quarantine won the Best Visual Effects or Design award at the 2021 edition of ES Europe International Film Festival.

References

External links
 

2021 films
2021 independent films
Russian drama films
Dystopian films
Russian dystopian films
2020s dystopian films
Apocalyptic films
Films about viral outbreaks
Russian independent films
Russian nonlinear narrative films
Russian avant-garde and experimental films
Finnish independent films
Finnish avant-garde and experimental films
Existentialist films
Russian-language Finnish films
2020s avant-garde and experimental films
Films set in bunkers